Seif Ali Iddi (born 23 February 1942) is a Tanzanian politician (under CCM political party) and former 2nd Vice President of Zanzibar. He was a Member of Parliament for Kitope constituency from 2000 to 2010.

References

1942 births
Living people
Zanzibari politicians
Vice presidents of Zanzibar
Chama Cha Mapinduzi MPs
Tanzanian MPs 2010–2015
Chama Cha Mapinduzi politicians